The 2013 Canadian Rugby Championship was the 5th season of the Canadian Rugby Championship.  The BC Bears re-enter the tournament after being represented by the Pacific Tyee last season. Continuing with the pattern established previous seasons, home field advantage has switched. The Western teams have three home games, while the Eastern teams only have two.

Participants

Regular season

Standings

Fixtures 
 All times local to where the game is being played

See also 
Canadian Rugby Championship
Rugby Canada

References 

Canadian Rugby Championship
Canadian Rugby Championship seasons
CRC